is a railway station in the city of Toyokawa, Aichi Prefecture, Japan, operated by Central Japan Railway Company (JR Tōkai).

Lines
Mikawa-Ichinomiya Station is served by the Iida Line, and is located 12.0 kilometers from the southern terminus of the line at Toyohashi Station.

Station layout
The station has two opposed side platforms connected by a footbridge. The station building is unattended. The station building is designed to resemble a shrine or temple building, as the station is the closest railway station to the ichinomiya of former Mikawa Province, the Toga Shrine.

Platforms

Adjacent stations

|-
!colspan=5|Central Japan Railway Company

Station history
Mikawa-Ichinomiya Station was established on July 22, 1897 as on the now-defunct . The station was renamed to its present name on January 1, 1916. On August 1, 1943, the Toyokawa Railway was nationalized along with some other local lines to form the Japanese Government Railways (JGR) Iida Line.  Scheduled freight operations were discontinued in 1971.  Along with its division and privatization of JNR on April 1, 1987, the station came under the control and operation of the Central Japan Railway Company  (JR Tōkai). A new station building was completed in December 1990.

Passenger statistics
In fiscal 2017, the station was used by an average of 745 passengers daily.

Surrounding area
Toga Shrine
 Ichinomiya Seibu Elementary School

See also
 List of Railway Stations in Japan

References

External links

Railway stations in Japan opened in 1897
Railway stations in Aichi Prefecture
Iida Line
Stations of Central Japan Railway Company
Toyokawa, Aichi